was a Japanese cross-country skier. He competed in the men's 18 kilometre event at the 1936 Winter Olympics.

References

1915 births
1978 deaths
Japanese male cross-country skiers
Olympic cross-country skiers of Japan
Cross-country skiers at the 1936 Winter Olympics
Sportspeople from Aomori Prefecture
20th-century Japanese people